Aq Tappeh or Aqtappeh, also rendered as Aq Tepe, may refer to:
 Aq Tappeh, Hamadan
 Aq Tappeh, Kabudarahang, Hamadan Province
 Aq Tappeh, Kurdistan
 Aq Tappeh, North Khorasan
 Aq Tappeh, West Azerbaijan